The Raffles Bulletin of Zoology is a peer-reviewed open-access scientific journal published by the Lee Kong Chian Natural History Museum at the National University of Singapore. It covers the taxonomy, ecology, and conservation of Southeast Asian fauna. Supplements are published as and when funding permits and may cover topics that extend beyond the normal scope of the journal depending on the targets of the funding agency. It was established as the Bulletin of the Raffles Museum in 1928 and renamed Bulletin of the National Museum of Singapore in 1961, before obtaining its current title in 1971.

See also
 List of zoology journals

References

Zoology journals
Biannual journals
Open access journals
English-language journals